Mauritius was a Crown colony off the southeast coast of Africa. Formerly part of the French colonial empire, British rule in Mauritius was  established de facto with the Invasion of Isle de France in November 1810, and de jure by the subsequent Treaty of Paris. British rule ended on 12 March 1968, when Mauritius became independent.

History 
Isle de France, which consisted of Mauritius and some other islands had been under French rule since 1715. However, during the Napoleonic Wars, despite the French naval victory in the Battle of Grand Port on 20–27 August 1810, Mauritius was captured on 3 December 1810 by the British under Commodore Josias Rowley. British possession of the island was confirmed four years later by the Treaty of Paris in 1814. Nonetheless, French institutions, including the Napoleonic Code of law, were maintained, and the French language was still more widely used than English.

The British administration, with Robert Townsend Farquhar as the first governor, brought about rapid social and economic changes. One of the most important was the abolition of slavery on 1 February 1835. Around 3,000 Franco-Mauritian planters received their share of the British government's compensation of 20 million pounds sterling (£20m) for the liberation of about 20,000 slaves, who had been imported from Africa and Madagascar during the French occupation.

The Mauritian Creole people trace their origins to the plantation owners and slaves who worked in the sugar fields. Indo-Mauritians are descended from Indian immigrants who arrived in the 19th century via the Aapravasi Ghat in order to work as indentured labourers after slavery was abolished. Included in the Indo-Mauritian community are Muslims (about 17% of the population) from the Indian subcontinent. In 1885, a new constitution was introduced. The Franco-Mauritian elite controlled nearly all of the large sugar estates and was active in business and banking. As the Indian population became numerically dominant and the voting franchise was extended, political power shifted from the Franco-Mauritians and their Creole allies to the Indo-Mauritians.

Conflicts arose between the Indian community (mostly sugarcane labourers) and the Franco-Mauritians in the 1920s, leading to several (mainly Indian) deaths. Following this, the Mauritius Labour Party was founded in 1936 by Maurice Curé to safeguard the interest of the labourers. Curé was succeeded a year later by Emmanuel Anquetil, who tried to gain the support of the port workers and was thus exiled to the island of Rodrigues in 1938. After his death, Guy Rozemont took over the leadership of the party.  Following the Uba riots of 1937 the local British government instituted significant reforms that un-banned labour unions, improved channels of arbitration between labourers and employers, and improved working conditions. However even deadlier riots broke out again in 1943 which became known as the Belle Vue Harel Massacre.

In the period just before the official declaration of independence and hand over of power to an independent government the island was rocked by a series of ethnic riots such as the 1965 Mauritius race riots,  August 1967 riots and ten day period of violent riots (January 1968) that resulted from ethnic tensions.

See also 
 Governors of Mauritius

References

External links

 
History of Mauritius
1810 establishments in the British Empire
Mauritius
1968 disestablishments in Africa
1810s establishments in Africa
States and territories disestablished in 1968